This article shows unofficial matches of the South Korea national football team. They don't meet the standard of international "A" matches.

International matches
The following matches are classified as unofficial matches against national teams or league selections.

1940s

1950s

1960s

1970s

1980s

1990s

2000s

2010s

Non-international matches 
The following matches are classified as unofficial matches against allied teams, regional teams, or clubs.

1940s

1950s

1960s

1970s

1980s

1990s

2000s

Other mentionable matches 

The following matches are unreleased in official website of the KFA.

Domestic matches

The following matches were played between South Korean teams.

See also
 South Korea national football team
 South Korea national football team results
 South Korea national football B team results

Notes

References

External links

South Korea national football team results
Lists of national association football team unofficial results